Pelita Harapan University (UPH) is a private Evangelical coeducational higher education institution run by the Pelita Harapan Education Foundation in Lippo Village, Tangerang, Banten, Indonesia. It was founded in 1993. 

UPH was the first university in Indonesia to introduce programs entirely taught in English, the first to offer a liberal arts curriculum, and the first to introduce a multi-disciplinary approach to its programs.

History
UPH was founded in 1993.

In 2006, UPH opened two residence halls, one of which was the MYC Dormitory. Students at the university's teacher's college are assigned to the Teacher College Dormitory, which opened in July.

In 2007, the university opened UPH Surabaya.

In 2014, UPH Medan opened.

Secondary school
UPH has an affiliated secondary school, called UPH College which also has a student dormitory. Its program provides a national plus curriculum, making it semi-international.

Sports 
UPH has a collegiate varsity basketball team called UPH Eagles. It has a winning basketball program. The Eagles were a four-peat champion in Liga Mahasiswa (LIMA). They won the championship for four consecutive years (2014, 2015, 2016 and 2017). In 2022, UPH was invited to the inaugural edition of the World University Basketball Series held August 9-11, 2022, at Yoyogi National Stadium Second Gymnasium in Tokyo, Japan. Only four universities from four different countries were invited to this pocket tournament.

Notable alumni 

 Vidi Aldiano, actor and singer
 Marcel Chandrawinata, Indonesian actor
 Veronica Koman, human rights activist
 Agnez Mo, actress, singer and songwriter
 Lestari Moerdijat, politician
 Mikha Tambayong,  actress and singer
 Sandiaga Uno, Minister of Tourism and Creative Economy, former Vice Governor of Jakarta, businessman
 Astrid Yunadi, Indonesian Model and Miss Indonesia 2011

See also 
UPH Eagles Basketball Team

References

External links
 
 

Association of Christian Universities and Colleges in Asia
Universities in Banten
Universities in Indonesia